The Abortion Support Network is a UK based charity which provides financial assistance, accommodation and consultation to people from the Republic of Ireland, Northern Ireland, the Isle of Man, Malta, Gibraltar and Poland who are seeking an abortion abroad.

The charity was founded in 2009 by Mara Clarke.

In 2017 as part of a coalition, ASN made a submission to the Citizens' Assembly. That same year, ASN fund-raised and provided over £73,000 (€84,000) worth of grants for all associated expenses of obtaining an abortion, including travel. The team of volunteers fielded 1,009 phone calls (685 from Ireland) providing free advice.

By 2020, ASN has made over £300,000 in grants, and been contacted by 5000 people.  In partnership with five organisations in four countries, ASN launched Abortion Without Borders to help people in Poland access abortions.

See also
 Abortion in the Republic of Ireland
 Abortion in Poland
 National Network of Abortion Funds, a similar organization working in the United States

References 

Abortion in the Republic of Ireland
Health charities in the United Kingdom
Reproductive rights
Abortion-rights organisations in the United Kingdom